The Guilin University of Electronic Technology (abbreviation:  GUET) is a state university, located in Guilin, Guangxi, China.

Campus
The university is divided into four campuses: 
East Campus
West Campus
Huajiang Campus
Beihai Campus

History 
Since its foundation in 1960, Guilin University of Electronic Technology has gradually developed into a university with Electronic Information Technology as its main discipline while the other disciplines include Mechanical Engineering, Business Management, Literature, Law, and Education. The university has ten departments offering 39 undergraduate programs, and 18 graduate programs for students from all over the world. It has about 20,000 full-time students.

In November 2018, the university announced plans for the inspection of mobile phones, computers and external disk drives on its campus in order to "stop the spread of content inciting violence, terrorism, harmful political information, pornographic and other content that corrupts thought", but reconsidered these plans after they met with disapproval from a wide range of parties.

See also
Faridpur Engineering College
Guilin University of Technology
Southwest Petroleum University

References

External links 
Guilin University of Electronic Technology

Universities and colleges in Guilin
Educational institutions established in 1960
1960 establishments in China